This is a list of U.S. county name etymologies, covering the letters J to M.

J

K

L

M

See also

Lists of U.S. county name etymologies for links to the remainder of the list
List of places named for the Marquis de Lafayette

References